On 17 March 1977 a British Airtours Boeing 707 being used for pilot training crashed and caught fire during its take-off roll at Glasgow Prestwick Airport. All four crew members on board survived.

Aircraft  
The aircraft was a Boeing 707-436, registered as G-APFK, and first flew in 1960.  Its construction number was 17712  and its four engines were Rolls-Royce Conway 508 turbines. The aircraft entered service with BOAC on 29 September 1960, transferred to BEA Airtours on 30 December 1971 and finally British Airtours on 1 April 1974.

Flight 
On board were: a 29-year-old first officer trainee; a 48-year-old flight commander; a captain trainee who was acting as flight engineer; and a supervisory first officer seated behind the commander. After the standard pushback and engine starting procedures, the commander relayed the crosswind information from the control tower to the trainee first officer, who was in control for the take-off. The wind forecast was 18 knots, increasing to 35 knots. No flight number was assigned to the training session.

Accident 
After receiving take-off clearance from the tower, the crew taxied the aircraft to runway 31 for departure. The trainee first officer commenced the take-off run by applying full power to the engines. The aircraft suddenly began to descend and the left wing dropped 20 degrees. The engine simulated as failing struck the left edge of runway 31. The aircraft then yawed and rolled to the right, and engine No.4 struck the ground. The aircraft slid sideways down the runway, tearing off all four engines and collapsing the landing gear while bursting into flames. It came to rest at the intersection with runway 3. During evacuation one crewman was injured.

Investigation 
The Air Accidents Investigation Branch (AAIB) began an investigation the day after the accident. According to the flight data and cockpit recorders, an engine failure would be simulated as an exercise for the two trainees to quickly demonstrate procedures for restarting or shutting down the failed engine. The AAIB determined the pilots did not deal with the failure as quickly as recommended. Usually, a pilot must deal with failed engine in 1 1/2 seconds, but the trainee first officer took 2–3 seconds.

Probable cause 
After investigating the crash for one year and four months, the  AAIB published its final report in September 1978, stating the probable cause of the accident:
"A loss of control which resulted from a delay in taking full corrective action during a simulated outboard engine failure exercise during take-off."

Aftermath 
G-APFK was damaged beyond repair in the accident and fire. It was written off in November 1978 and scrapped in 1979.

References

British Airtours accidents and incidents
Accidents and incidents involving the Boeing 707
Airliner accidents and incidents caused by engine failure
Aviation accidents and incidents in 1977
March 1977 events in the United Kingdom
Aviation accidents and incidents in Scotland